Eetu Kallioinen (born 23 May 1998) is a Finnish sport shooter. He won a bronze medal in skeet at the 2021 European Shooting Championships. He represented Finland at the 2020 Summer Olympics in Tokyo 2021, competing in men's skeet.

References

External links

 

1998 births
Living people
Finnish male sport shooters
Shooters at the 2020 Summer Olympics
Olympic shooters of Finland